The 1959 Merdeka Tournament was the third edition of the Merdeka Tournament which was an annual tournament hosted in Malaya. It took place from August 30 to September 6 with seven participating nations.

First round
A series of knockout ties was held to determine which teams would compete in the second round. The match between South Vietnam and Singapore required a replay as the score was level at the end of the first match.

Replay

Consolation round

Replay

Second round

References
1959 Merdeka Tournament at RSSSF
 (information given by  Jaydeep Basu, Sunil Warrier, and Gautam Roy).

Merdeka Cup
Merd
Merd
Merd